George Rowell may refer to:

George P. Rowell (1838–1908), American advertising executive
George Rowell (historian) (died 2001), theatre historian
George Rowell, American blacksmith, brother of John Samuel Rowell
George Rowell, American clergyman, completed Gulick-Rowell House; see National Register of Historic Places listings in Hawaii